"Let Me Get There" is a song by American-Irish band Hope Sandoval & the Warm Inventions, released as the second single from their third studio album, Until the Hunter (2016). The song features guest vocals from singer-songwriter Kurt Vile. It was the second release issued through the band's own independent record label, Tendril Tales, following previous single "Isn't It True".

The single was released as a limited edition 10" vinyl on September 23, 2016, with a one-track digital single following a month later. The vinyl contained a B-side, "That Spider", which later appeared on the UK deluxe edition of the album. A music video for the song, directed by Sandoval, was released in early October.

Track listing

Versions
 Full length version (7:29) – distributed via INgrooves' SoundCloud account to media outlets.
 Video edit (4:01) – a heavily edited version of the song, containing two verses and choruses along with a small portion of the outro. This version is available on the song's music video.

Personnel
Credits adapted from the vinyl liner notes.

Musicians
 Hope Sandoval – songwriter, instrumentation, lead vocals, producer, mixing
 Colm Ó Cíosóig – songwriter, drums, producer, engineer
 Kurt Vile – lead vocals ("Let Me Get There")
 Dave Brennan – songwriter, guitar 
 Alan Browne – bass
 Charles Cullen – guitar
 Alan Montgomery – bass ("That Spider")
 Mick Whelan – keyboards

Technical
 Barry Bödeker – artwork
 Jamieson Durr – mixing
 Frank Gironda – management
 Michael Manning – engineer

Charts

Release history

References

2016 singles
2016 songs